The W78 is an American thermonuclear warhead with an estimated yield of , deployed on the LGM-30G Minuteman III intercontinental ballistic missile (ICBM) and housed in the Mark 12A reentry vehicle. It is publicly estimated that 1083 warheads were manufactured.

History
The W78 was designed at Los Alamos National Laboratory (LANL) starting in 1974. It is thought that the warhead has never been tested at full yield, with the weapon producing a "disappointing" yield shortly before the 1976 Threshold Test Ban Treaty came into force, leading to a redesign of the weapon that was not complete before the treaty came into force. This led to a dispute between LANL and Lawrence Livermore National Laboratory who estimated the weapon's yield below that of LANL. The dispute was resolved by a panel led by former LLNL director John Foster who found in favor of LANL's yield estimate.

The final W62 warhead was not removed from service until March 2010. This leaves the W78 and W87 warheads as the only warheads carried by Minuteman III. Downloading of the Minuteman III missile (reducing the number of warheads carried) was completed in June 2014, reducing the warheads carried by each missile from three to one.

Design

Dimensions of the W78 are unknown, but it fits within the Mark 12A reentry vehicle which is conically shaped.

It is speculated that the weapon combines the secondary (fusion) stage design of an older warhead such as the W50, with a more modern primary stage.

See also
 List of nuclear weapons

References

External links
 W78 Warhead page at nuclearweaponarchive.org

Nuclear warheads of the United States
Military equipment introduced in the 1970s